Avioth is a commune in the Meuse department in the Grand Est region in northeastern France.

Population

See also
Communes of the Meuse department

References

External links
  Photos of Our Lady's basilica in Avioth

Communes of Meuse (department)